The Northern Ontario Resource Trail (NORT) is the designation of two
mainly gravel roads in the Canadian province of Ontario. One road travels north from Pickle Lake to the northern shore of Windigo Lake, then to the North Caribou Lake First Nation at Weagamow Lake. The second road travels north from Red Lake. Both link several winter roads and ice roads that serve communities in extreme Northern Ontario with the provincial highway system. The first  of the Pickle Lake–Windigo Lake Road, as far as the Otoskwin River, also held the tertiary highway designation of Highway808 within the provincial highway system from 1966 to 1983.

Route description

Pickle Lake 
The Northern Ontario Resource Trail at Pickle Lake begins at the northern end of Highway 599 in Central Patricia and travels  to Windigo Lake. It initially meanders northeast before turning northwest. From the north shore of the lake the route continues for approximate  to serve the North Caribou Lake First Nation.

Although the road is maintained year-round, it is extremely lightly travelled, and is in a very remote section of the province. Motorists should stock up on supplies in Pickle Lake, and be prepared for remote bush travel. It is recommended to fill up on gasoline and supplies, and check weather conditions before travelling down this road, since there are no gas stations or any other services on the Northern Ontario Resource Trail north of Pickle Lake. Caution must be used while driving as well, as there are some steep grades on the route.

Red Lake 
It begins at an intersection with Highway 125 just west of Balmertown.
Several winter roads connect to Nungessor Road, and provide access and supplies from approximately January to March each year to fly-in First Nations territories in the far north of Ontario. Due to the effects of climate change, the roads have been open for a shorter period each year. Consequently, several First Nations are studying the feasibility of connecting to the road network with all-season roads.

Communities served 
The Northern Ontario Resource Trail serves several communities via ice/winter roads that branch from it:
 Bearskin Lake First Nation
 Kitchenuhmaykoosib Inninuwug First Nation (Big Trout Lake)
 Eabametoong First Nation (Fort Hope)
 Kasabonika Lake First Nation
 Keewaywin First Nation
 Kingfisher First Nation
 Koocheching First Nation
 Muskrat Dam Lake First Nation
 Neskantaga First Nation (Lansdowne House)
 Sachigo Lake First Nation
 Sandy Lake First Nation
 Nibinamik First Nation (Summer Beaver)
 Wapekeka First Nation
 Wawakapewin First Nation
 North Caribou Lake First Nation (Weagamow Lake)
 Webequie First Nation
 Wunnumin Lake First Nation

History

Pickle Lake 
The Pickle Lake Northern Ontario Resource Trail was built beginning in 1962 under the Resources Roads program, which was jointly funded by the provincial and federal government to encourage mineral exploration in the far north of Ontario.
However, the road was not travelable until the following year, when timber crib and steel girder bridges were opened over the Crow River in Central Patricia and at July Falls.

On December15, 1966, the  portion of Highway599 from Central Patricia to the Otoskwin River was re-designated as Highway808.
This designation lasted until 1983, when it was decommissioned as an official Provincial Highway.
The southernmost three km of the trail is paved, while the remaining length is gravel. The road is maintained year-round, due to its importance as a connection to natural resources sites and to ice/winter roads connecting remote First Nations communities in the Kenora District.

Beginning in December 2013, the North Caribou Lake First Nation undertook engineering and environmental studies on connecting to the provincial highway network by extending the Northern Ontario Resource Trail. Construction of a bridge over the Weagamog Lake Narrows as well as the new road south to Windigo Lake commenced in late 2016 or early 2017.

Red Lake

Major intersections

Pickle Lake

Red Lake

References 

Roads in Kenora District